Joseph Baena (born October 2, 1997) is an American film actor, bodybuilder, fitness model and real estate agent.  Despite being the son of Arnold Schwarzenegger, he chose not to use the same last name.

Early life
Joseph Baena is the son of Arnold Schwarzenegger and Mildred Patricia "Patty" Baena. He is the stepson of Rogelio Baena, and the maternal half-brother of Jackie Rozo of his mother's side. He is the paternal half-brother of Katherine, Christina, Patrick, and Christopher Schwarzenegger of his father's side. His paternal half-brother Christopher was born 5 days earlier on September 27, 1997. He is of Austrian and Guatemalan descent. In 2010, at the age of 13, Baena first learned the identity of his real biological father, which was revealed the day after Schwarzenegger ceased to be governor.

In 2011, he achieved some notoriety in tabloids when Schwarzenegger admitted conceiving him in an adulterous affair with a former household staffer, Mildred Baena, while he was married to Maria Shriver.

Personal life
In 2019, Baena graduated from Pepperdine University in Malibu, California.

In March 2021, Baena started training Brazilian jiu-jitsu at Checkmat Northridge.

Career
Baena was featured on the cover of the Men's Health March 2022 issue, highlighting his fitness practices and his familial bonding with his father.  He is a weight lifter.  A gift from his father, The Encyclopedia of Modern Bodybuilding coauthored by him, assisted his training.

Baena was a contestant on the 31st season of Dancing with the Stars where he was paired with Daniella Karagach, they were eliminated 5th and placed in 11th of the competition.

Trying to distance himself from prejudgements, and creating his own grounds, "the young Arnold son says that he is not just breaking down the 'dance floor' but is also 'breaking the barriers in his family.'"  His body type, flexibility and fitness training are not particularly well adapted to dancing, so he personally foresees challenges.

He offered the opinion that physical fitness became his watchword because, "I couldn't keep up with the other guys."  In a podcast interview, he confessed that he was both unfit and bullied.  In college, he had an Epiphany:  "I was like the chubby kid in my… crew, and, um yeah. It wasn't until I joined swim my sophomore year…” When he could not run, leaving him unfit for soccer and basketball, he settled on joining the swim team.

Since 2022, Baena has been a real estate agent at Aria Properties. He expressed an interest in a real estate career on Instagram in May 2021.

Filmography

Film

Television

References

Notes

Citations

External links
Joseph Schwarzenegger at IMDb

1997 births
21st-century American male actors
American bodybuilders
American male film actors
American male models
American male television actors
American people of Austrian descent
American people of Guatemalan descent
American real estate brokers
Brentwood School (Los Angeles) alumni
Hispanic and Latino American male actors
Hispanic and Latino American male models
Living people
Male actors from California
Male actors from Los Angeles
Male bodybuilders
Male models from California
Models from Los Angeles
People from Brentwood, Los Angeles
Schwarzenegger family
Sportspeople from Los Angeles